Peter Annis (born December 17, 1962) is an American curler from Owatonna, Minnesota. He was a member of Team USA at the 2008 World Men's Curling Championship. Annis coached Rich Ruohonen's men's team to victory at the 2019 Americas Challenge, securing a spot for the United States at the 2020 World Men's Championship.

Teams

References

External links
 
 

1962 births
Living people
American male curlers
Sportspeople from Mankato, Minnesota
People from Owatonna, Minnesota
American curling champions
Continental Cup of Curling participants